Kusalar (also Romanized as Kūsālār; also known as Kūhsālār) is a village in Bastamlu Rural District, in the Central District of Khoda Afarin County, East Azerbaijan Province, Iran. At the 2006 census, its population was 155, in 31 families.

References 

Populated places in Khoda Afarin County